The Migrants is a 1974 American drama television film directed and produced by Tom Gries and written by Lanford Wilson, based on a story by Tennessee Williams. The film stars Cloris Leachman, Ron Howard, and Sissy Spacek. It received for six Primetime Emmy Award nominations, including Outstanding Special – Comedy or Drama and Best Lead Actress in a Drama for Leachman.

Synopsis
A family of migratory farm workers travels the country performing seasonal work.

Cast

 Cloris Leachman as Viola Barlow
 Ron Howard as Lyle Barlow
 Sissy Spacek as Wanda Trimpin
 Cindy Williams as Betty
 Ed Lauter as Mr. Barlow
 Lisa Lucas as Molly Barlow
 Mills Watson as Hec Campbell
 David Clennon as Tom Trimpin
 Dinah Englund as Billie Jean Barlow
 Brad Sullivan as Johnson
 Leon Russom as Doctor
 Claudia McNeil as Rose Daw
 Tom Rosqui as Father
 Dolph Sweet as Sheriff
 Mari Gorman as Miss Travers
 Wally Parnell as First Overseer
 George Castellini as Second Overseer
 Henry Newman as Beard
 Richard DeFeo as Diaz
 Rudolph Tillman as Mr. Daw
 Joseph Brady as Minister
 Bill Pope as Billy Dan
 Sol Weiner as Sheriff's Deputy
 Kathleen Garrison as Baby
 Suzanne Garrison as Baby #2

Production
Filming took place in Vineland, New Jersey.

Reception
New York Times reviewer Cyclops criticized the fact that many of the usual Tennessee Williams elements were missing. Howard Rosenberg of the Los Angeles Times, however, placed the movie on his list of the 30 best TV movies.

Awards and nominations

References

External links
 
 

1974 films
1974 drama films
1974 television films
1970s English-language films
CBS network films
American drama television films
Films about families
Films about farmers
Films based on works by Tennessee Williams
Films directed by Tom Gries
Films scored by Billy Goldenberg
Films set on farms
Films shot in New Jersey
1970s American films